Magpie (Margaret Pye) is a supervillain appearing in American comic books published by DC Comics. She was created by John Byrne, and first appeared in The Man of Steel #3 (November 1986).

The character has been portrayed in live-action by Sarah Schenkkan in the final season of Gotham, and by Rachel Matthews in the first season of the Arrowverse series Batwoman.

Fictional character biography

Magpie is a jewel thief who specifically targets jewels named after birds and then replaces them with booby-trapped replicas. Taking a job as a museum curator, Pye is slowly driven mad surrounded by the beautiful things that she so loves but can never own. She was notable in Post-Crisis continuity as the first villain who was defeated by Superman and Batman working together, Superman having visited Gotham to "apprehend" Batman before Batman's demonstration of his skills while tracking Magpie convinced Superman that Gotham needed someone like Batman to protect it.

Some time after during the events of Legends, Pye is released on an insanity plea and goes on another rampage, before eventually being stopped by Batman and Jason Todd.

Magpie disappears for a length of time, until it is revealed that she is Poison Ivy's cellmate at Arkham Asylum.

Shortly thereafter, she is murdered by the Tally Man II, along with Orca, the Ventriloquist and Scarface and the KGBeast, villains working for the Penguin. Ultimately, her death was part of a revenge scheme by the criminal known as the Great White Shark.

During the "Blackest Night" storyline, Magpie is among the many deceased villains that receive a black power ring and are reanimated as Black Lanterns. She is seen slaughtering people in a grocery store and working closely with the reanimated Trigger Twins and King Snake.

In 2011, DC Comics rebooted the DC Universe through "The New 52". During the "Forever Evil" storyline, Magpie appears as a member of the Secret Society of Super Villains which Outsider set up on behalf of the Crime Syndicate of America.

In 2016, DC Comics implemented another relaunch of its books called "DC Rebirth", which restored its continuity to a form much as it was prior to the New 52. Magpie is one of the villains taken down by Batman and Catwoman after he takes her along with him on an average night of his job and fought Batgirl in her quest for justice. She has also had a run-in with the Flash and Iris West after they were undercover as supervillains in the nation of Zandia, which serves as a haven for criminals like her.

When at Belle Reve, Magpie joined the Suicide Squad. On her only mission, she and the Suicide Squad were sent to fight some Revolutionaries. Magpie infiltrated the submarine where the base of the Revolutionaries is located and was killed by Thylacine almost immediately.

Powers and abilities
Magpie is an expert at hand-to-hand combat. Later appearances showed her with the ability to extend her fingernails into claws.

Equipment
Magpie is an expert at creating gadgetry that resembles the items that she stole. She also makes use of weapons that are explosive, can emit airborne toxins, or shoot razor blades.

Other characters named Magpie
A male character named Merg Gaterra uses the name Magpie in Pre-Zero Hour comics. He was an Angtuan enemy of the Legion of Super-Heroes and was hired by Monitor to steal items from the Legion's headquarters.

Alternative versions

Injustice 2
Magpie appears in the prequel comic to Injustice 2. Following the events of the first game, Magpie is shown as a member of this universe's Suicide Squad. The Impostor Batman detonated the bomb in Magpie's head for being useless.

Batman: Li'l Gotham
Magpie appears in the Batman: Li'l Gotham comics.

In other media

Television
 Magpie appears in Beware the Batman, voiced by Grey DeLisle. This version is a split personality of Margaret Sorrow, who was the subject of a failed experiment meant to remove her kleptomania in exchange for a reduced sentence at Blackgate Penitentiary that granted her the ability to extend her nails into poisonous claws and the inability to feel pain. Later in the series, Magpie develops an obsessive attraction towards Batman and jealousy towards his partner Katana.
 Magpie appears in the Gotham episode "13 Stitches", portrayed by Sarah Schenkkan. This version's design takes inspiration from the Beware the Batman incarnation.
 Magpie appears in Batwoman, portrayed by Rachel Matthews. This version utilizes 3-D printed bombs to distract from her jewelry robberies, poses as photographer Margot to canvas potential heist locations, and has a sister named Reagan Nye (portrayed by Brianne Howey). While attempting to steal Martha Wayne's necklace, she runs afoul of Batwoman and is eventually incarcerated at Blackgate Penitentiary. After being transferred to Arkham Asylum, Alice releases Magpie to help her steal Lucius Fox's journal.
 Magpie appears in promotional artwork released for Harley Quinn.

Film
Magpie makes a minor non-speaking appearance in The Lego Batman Movie.

Miscellaneous
 Magpie appears in the DC Super Hero Girls tie-in comic books.
 Magpie appears in the Spotify audio series Harley Quinn and The Joker: Sound Mind, voiced Mary Holland.

References

DC Comics female supervillains
Comics characters introduced in 1986
Fictional serial killers
Fictional mass murderers
Fictional thieves
Characters created by John Byrne (comics)
Fictional murdered people
Suicide Squad members